Brighter than a Thousand Suns may refer to:

Brighter than a Thousand Suns (album), by the band Killing Joke
Brighter than a Thousand Suns (book), by Robert Jungk first published in English in 1958
"Brighter than a Thousand Suns," a track from the Iron Maiden album A Matter of Life and Death

See also
"Brighter Than the Sun", a song by Colbie Caillat